, also known as Kenichi Okuma, Kenichi Ohkuma, Kenichi Ookuma, or Ken-ichi Ookuma, was a Japanese video game music composer, sound designer and musician.

Video games

 Sengoku no Hasha: Tenka Fubu he no Michi (1995) Super Famicom
 Poi Poi Ninja World (1996) Super Famicom
 Ring ni Kakero (1998) Super Famicom
 Mystic Ark: Maboroshi Gekijou (1998) PlayStation (with Makoto Asai, Yuichiro Honda, Masaki Takimoto)
 Langrisser V: The End of Legend (1998)
 Super Smash Bros. Brawl (2008) Wii – Composer of "Flat Zone 2", "Pokémon Gym/Evolution" and "Gyromite"

See also
 List of video game musicians

References

External links
 Kenichi Ōkuma at VGMdb
 Kenichi Ōkuma at GiantBomb
 Kenichi Ōkuma ~ 大熊謙一 (おおくま けんいち) at atwiki.jp 
 Kenichi Ōkuma at MobyGames
 Kenichi Ōkuma at Last.fm
 Kenichi Ōkuma at GameFAQs

 

1966 births
2022 deaths
Japanese composers
Musicians from Saitama Prefecture
Video game composers